Milano Rogoredo  is a railway station in Milan, Italy. It is one of the key nodes of the Milan suburban railway service as the southern gate of the Milanese urban network.

History

Early history
The station's location was originally (as of 1891) a junction for the old cargo station of Milano Sempione; it became a cargo station itself in 1908. Its function was to serve as the cargo station for the then-autonomous town of Rogoredo, today included in the city administration as part of Milan's southeastern border with San Donato Milanese.

Later, in the late 1950s, it was expanded to a passenger station. This step came when the city of Milan started to grow faster and various factories were established in the area, such as the Montedison chemical facility and the Redaelli steel plant. The station grew proportionally with the industrial development of the area.

Recent history
A modernization of the station was planned in the 1990s, and some reconstruction of the station was carried out including platform roofing. However, in 1995, work was stopped due to costs exceeding the budgeted funds. In 1999, work restarted to add four tracks to allow integration with the Passante railway and the high-speed line, as well as to complete the platform roofing.

The importance of this station has increased with the extension of the Milan suburban railway service to Pavia and Lodi, and the new residential district called Santa Giulia. The station is fully operational. The station includes a stop for the Regionale trains from Parma to the Milano Centrale station, and it became possible in August 2009 to change to the S-lines for connections through the Passante into Central Milan and on to Malpensa Airport at Bovisa.

Several Eurostar Italia trains between Milan and Rome stop in Rogoredo. In 2011, the Eurostar Italia-rival Nuovo Trasporto Viaggiatori started a high-speed-service running from Torino Porta Susa to Salerno, stopping at Rogoredo as well as at the Porta Garibaldi station.

Since 3 September 2012 a FrecciaClub has been added in place of the waiting room, which does not exist anymore.

Train services
The station is served by the following service(s):

High speed services (Frecciarossa) Turin - Milan - Bologna - Florence - Rome - Naples - Salerno
High speed services (Italo) Turin - Milan - Bologna - Florence - Rome - Naples - Salerno
High speed services (Italo) Turin - Milan - Bologna - Ancona

References

External links
Opening ceremony for the renewed station in 2008 report
Official page on Ferrovie dello Stato website

Rogoredo
Railway stations opened in 1861
Milan S Lines stations
1861 establishments in Italy
Railway stations in Italy opened in the 19th century